The Frankland River is a major perennial river located in the north-west region of Tasmania, Australia.

Location and features
Formed by the confluence of the Horton and Lindsay rivers, the Frankland River rises in the Sumac Forest Reserve and flows generally west by north. The Frankland River reaches its mouth in remote country east of the settlement of  where it empties into the Arthur River. The river descends  over its  course.

The river draws its name from George Frankland, an English surveyor and Surveyor-General of Van Diemen's Land between 1827 and 1838.

See also

Rivers of Tasmania

References

Rivers of Tasmania
North West Tasmania